Treateth is a melodic death metal band. In the beginning named Hostilis of Mort. They are from Guatemala City, Guatemala. Formed at the end of 2007, as an idea of Erick and Marco Orozco, who always get a lot of trouble for find members for the band that be qualified by the expectations for the brothers. Treateth stars in 2008, when the actual vocalist came into the band. The band has released one EP, five singles, and one studio album being recorded.

Biography

Hostilis of Mort 

The band began, at late 2007 with the original band members and creators of Treateth, the brothers Marco and Erick. At the beginning the band was called Hostilis Of Mort, but what they two wanted to play deserved a different name, so Treateth was born. The two brothers went to a lot of trouble finding good members for the band since the beginning, but, no one filled the expectations of the brothers, so, no one stayed much in the band, since they finally found Pablo, Josue and Lin.

Treateth Began 4 October 2008 when they entered a Band contest named Rock-A-Guate. Treateth went to the finals, but didn't win the contest, but they won much more, Completing finally the line-up with front-girl Lin.

Ineo Di Legato
A Demo was released at the beginning of 2009 as a "Good Bye" to the old Treateth and a Welcome to the new Metal Band Treateth. The demo was a compilation of 3 of a few more songs that the band used to play in shows called "Ineo di Legato".

The songs on the demo are:

Eugenics

Track listing:

Treateth en 2010-2011
Treateth, now complete, began writing new stuff, Treateth got serious, with brutal vocals, sick drumming, and mixing some crazy guitar riffs and what is something that in the band can't miss is the Melodic riffs, giving the band a new and brutal sound, a FULL-METAL sound.

Now Treateh is working in his second studio album called "Beneath The Gods".

Members

Current members 

 Linda Orellana - Vocals
 Marco Orozco - Lead Guitar / Back Vocals
 Luis Solis - 2nd Guitar
 Erick Orozco - Bass
 Josue del Valle - Drums

Past members
 Pablo Rios - 2nd Guitar

Discography

Demos and EP 
Ineo di Legato (2008)

Studio albums
Eugenics (2010)
Beneath The Gods (2011–2012)

Singles 
 Scars of a new beginning
 Unreachable
 Consilium of Occasus

References

External links
 Myspace

Guatemalan heavy metal musical groups
Death metal musical groups
Musical quartets
Musical groups established in 2008
Musical groups disestablished in 2011